The 2002 Football League Trophy Final (known as the LDV Vans Trophy for sponsorship reasons) was the 19th final of the Football League Trophy – a domestic football cup competition for teams from the Football League Second and Third Division. The match was played at the Millennium Stadium in Cardiff, and was contested by Blackpool and Cambridge United on 24 March 2002. Blackpool won the match 4–1.

Match details

External links
Official website
Match result & lineups at Soccerbase

EFL Trophy Finals
Football League Trophy Final 2002
Football League Trophy Final 2002
Trophy Final